Butler Ridge Provincial Park is a provincial park in British Columbia, Canada. Located on the northern shore of the Peach Reach arm of Williston Lake,  20 km northwest of Hudson's Hope, the park covers an area of 6,694 ha. Within the Peace Foothills ecosection, it includes three biogeoclimatic zones: the Engelmann Spruce-Subalpine Fir, the Sub-Boreal Spruce, and the Black and White Boreal Spruce zones. This cold and moist area is used as winter ranges by caribou, Stone's sheep, moose, and elk. It is recognized by the province and the Treaty 8 Tribal Association as an area that has traditionally been used by First Nations people. The park is used for fishing, hunting, trapping, hiking, and wildlife/nature viewing, cross-country skiing. There is a boat launch for Williston Lake, and motorized recreation (ATV, snowmobile is permitted on designated trails).

References
British Columbia. Ministry of Employment and Investment (March 1999). Dawson Creek Land & Resource Management Plan.
Ministry of Environment's Butler Ridge Page

External links

Provincial parks of British Columbia
Peace River Country
2000 establishments in British Columbia